Rameswar Dhanowar (14 July 1939 – 10 July 2017) was an Indian politician from the state of Assam. He was a Member of the Assam Legislative Assembly from the Indian National Congress for Digboi. He was made a minister in Hiteswar Saikia and Tarun Gogoi’s cabinet.

Early life and education 
Rameswar Dhanowar was born on 14 July 1939 to Jethua Dhanowar and Umee Dhanowar in Sibsagar. He received a B.A. from Guwahati University in 1964.

Political career 
Dhanowar was the Indian National Congress candidate for the constituency of Digboi in the 1978 Assam Legislative Assembly Election. He obtained 10312 votes, 32.66% of the total vote. He defeated his nearest opponent by 67 votes. Dhanowar sought reelection in the 1983 Assam Legislative Assembly election. He received 6530 votes, 72.23% of the total vote and he defeated his nearest opponent by 4643 votes. He was made minister of Labour and Employment in the Hiteswar Saikia Cabinet.  In the 1985 Assam Legislative Assembly election, Dhanowar sought reelection in Digboi. He received  27438 votes, 58.54% of the total vote. He defeated his nearest opponent by 15108 votes.  In the 1991 Assam Legislative Assembly election, he sought reelection. He received 33799 votes, 63.75% of the total vote. He defeated his nearest opponent by 22745 votes. In the 1996 Assam Legislative Assembly election he was reelected by a margin of 26969 votes. In 2001 he was reelected again by a margin of 17654 votes. He was made minister for Excise, Labour and Employment in the first Tarun Gogoi cabinet.

In the 2006 Assam Legislative Assembly election, Dhanowar received 35773 votes, defeating his nearest opponent by 12735 votes and was reelected. In the 2011 Assam Legislative Assembly election. He received  38663 votes, 50.04% of the total vote. He defeated his nearest opponent by 10758 votes and was reelected. He did not seek reelection in 2016, after being MLA for 38 years. His son was the Congress candidate but lost.

Personal life 
He married Rani Dhanowar on 27 April 1967 and they had three sons and two daughters. His son, Gautam Dhanowar, was the Indian National Congress candidate for Digboi in 2016 but lost. His son resigned from the Indian National Congress after being denied the 2021 ticket for Digboi and he later joined BJP. Another of his sons, Manoj, contested the 2019 Lok Sabha elections for Dibrugarh but lost and contested the 2021 Assam Legislative Assembly election for Lahowal but again lost. Manoj Dhanowar later resigned from the Indian National Congress.

Failing health and death 
On 6 March 2017, Chief Minister Sarbananda Sonowal visited Dhanowar at Assam Medical College in Dibrugarh, due to Dhanowar’s failing health. On 10 July, Dhanowar died at around 6:45 am at the age of 77 after a prolonged illness, the same day as another long serving MLA and congress minister Mithius Tudu. He was survived by his wife and children.

Several politicians including Sarbananda Sonowal, Tarun Gogoi, Bhubaneswar Kalita, Ripun Bora, Siddhartha Bhattacharya and Abdul Khalque expressed their condolences on Twitter. Sonowal and leader of the opposition Debabrata Saikia both paid tribute, with Sonowal saying "both Tudu and Dhanowar were people’s representatives for long years and had contributed significantly to the socio-political life of Assam. Their contributions as politicians and social workers will be remembered for long."

Dhanowar’s last rites were performed at Digboi crematorium. Thousands of Congress workers, well-wishers and others turned up to pay their last respects. His eldest son lit the funeral pyre.  After the rituals at Dhanowar's house, his body was carried in an open vehicle to a private college run by Dhanowar’s son. Later, his body was kept at Rajiv Bhawan where Doom Dooma MLA Durga Bhumij, Digboi MLA Suren Phukan, Tinsukia MLA Sanjoy Kishan, former Moran MLA Jiban Tara Ghatowar and former Doom Dooma MLA Dileswar Tanti, among others, paid their last respects. A minute's silence was observed followed by a condolence meeting. Phukan said, "we have lost a good politician and a great human being with a big heart."

Positions held

References 

1939 births
2017 deaths
Assam MLAs 1978–1983
Assam MLAs 1983–1985
Assam MLAs 1985–1991
Assam MLAs 1991–1996
Assam MLAs 1996–2001
Assam MLAs 2001–2006
Assam MLAs 2006–2011
Assam MLAs 2011–2016
State cabinet ministers of Assam